The 1929 LFF Lyga was the 8th season of the LFF Lyga football competition in Lithuania.  It was contested by 11 teams, and KSS Klaipėda won the championship.

Kaunas Group

Klaipėda Group

Final
KSS Klaipėda 4-2 LFLS Kaunas

References
RSSSF

LFF Lyga seasons
Lith
Lith
1